Neoplatypedia constricta is a species of cicada in the family Cicadidae. It is found in North America.

References

Further reading

External links

 

Insects described in 1920
Platypediini